Motru may refer to:

In geography:
 Motru, a city in Gorj County, Romania
 Motru (river), a tributary of the Jiu in the Southwest of Romania
 Gura Motrului, village in commune Butoiești, Mehedinți County, Romania

In history:
 Amutria, ancient Dacian town, possibly modern Motru or Gura Motrului
 Amutria River, ancient Dacian name of the Motru River

In other uses:
 Constantin Rădulescu-Motru, a Romanian philosopher, psychologist, sociologist, logician, academic, dramatist, as well as centre-left nationalist politician